AdeptXBBS was a BBS originally written explicitly for the OS/2 operating system in 1994.  At that time the BBS sub-culture was at its height, and the Internet was emerging.  As a result, the authors wrote this system to compete with the many DOS based BBS systems available in commercial markets; however, AdeptXBBS boasted built-in internet gateways, built-in FidoNet capability, and native modern operating system support as differentiating features.

AdeptXBBS was based on XBBS by Mark Kimes and was licensed by AdeptSoft of Boca Raton, Florida.  AdeptSoft was composed of John Lawlor (financial backer), and programmers Steven Tower, Gordon Zeglinski, and John Morris  (who was remotely based in Nevada).

While AdeptXBBS was completed with much of the functionality, features, and performance promised, the product never reached the popularity that the authors hoped.  In particular the Internet came into wide use, and lower-than expected revenue meant AdeptSoft could no longer make its planned royalty payments to Mark Kimes.  The software was subsequently discontinued.

John Lawlor co-founded EmailChannel.com, an early ESP (Email Service Provider), in 1995.

The true author of XBBS was Sanford Zelkovitz Ph.D.

References

Bulletin board system software